The women's single sculls competition at the 2000 Summer Olympics in Sydney, Australia took place at the Sydney International Regatta Centre.

Competition format
This rowing event is a single scull event, meaning that each boat is propelled by a single rower. The "scull" portion means that the rower uses two oars, one on each side of the boat; this contrasts with sweep rowing in which each rower has one oar and rows on only one side (not feasible for singles events). The competition consists of multiple rounds. Finals were held to determine the placing of each boat; these finals were given letters with those nearer to the beginning of the alphabet meaning a better ranking. Semifinals were named based on which finals they fed, with each semifinal having two possible finals.

During the first round six heats were held. The winning boat in each heat advanced to the semifinals, while all others were relegated to the repechages.

The repechages were rounds which offered rowers a chance to qualify for the semi-final. Placing in the repechages determined which semifinal the boat would race in. The top three boats in each repechage moved on to the A/B semifinals, with the bottom three boats going to the C/D semifinals.

Four semifinals were held, two each of A/B semifinals, and C/D semifinals. For each semifinal race, the top three boats moved on to the better of the two finals, while the bottom three boats went to the lesser of the two finals possible. For example, a second-place finish in an A/B semifinal would result in advancement to the A final. Since 19 boats are qualified in this event, the last boat in C/D semifinals is eliminated from the competition.

The fourth and final round was the Finals. Each final determined a set of rankings. The A final determined the medals, along with the rest of the places through 6th. The B final gave rankings from 7th to 12th, the C from 13th to 18th, and so on. Thus, to win a medal rowers had to finish in the top four of their heat, top three of their quarterfinal, and top three of their A/B semifinal to reach the A final.

Schedule
All times are Australian Time (UTC+10)

Results

Heats
The winner of each heat advanced to the semifinals, remainder goes to the repechage.

Heat 1

Heat 2

Heat 3

Heat 4

Repechage
First two qualify for semifinals A/B, remainder to semifinals C/D.

Repechage 1

Repechage 2

Repechage 3

Repechage 4

Semifinals

Semifinals C/D
First three qualify to Final C.

Semifinal 1

Semifinal 2

Semifinals A/B
First three qualify to Final A, remainder to Final B.

Semifinal 1

Semifinal 2

Finals

Final C

Final B

Final A

References

External links
Official Report of the 2000 Sydney Summer Olympics
Rowing Results

Rowing at the 2000 Summer Olympics
Women's rowing at the 2000 Summer Olympics
Women's events at the 2000 Summer Olympics